Azzedine Benchaïra (born November 2, 1978 in Biskra) is an Algerian footballer who plays as a defender for CA Bordj Bou Arreridj in the Algerian Ligue Professionnelle 1.

Honours
 Won the Algerian League twice with ES Sétif in 2007 and 2009
 Won the Arab Champions League twice with ES Sétif in 2007 and 2008
 Won the North African Cup of Champions once with ES Sétif in 2009
 Finalist of the CAF Confederation Cup once with ES Sétif in 2009

References

1978 births
Algerian footballers
Living people
People from Biskra
ES Sétif players
CA Bordj Bou Arréridj players
Algerian Ligue Professionnelle 1 players
US Biskra players
JSM Béjaïa players
Association football defenders
21st-century Algerian people